is a Japanese football player. She plays for Chifure AS Elfen Saitama. She played for Japan national team.

Club career
Arakawa was born in Nerima, Tokyo on 30 October 1979. In 1997, she joined L.League club Yomiuri-Seiyu Beleza (later Nippon TV Beleza) from youth team. She was selected Best Eleven in 2003 and 2004. In the September 2008 WPS International Draft, she was drafted by FC Gold Pride in the top level US based Women's Professional Soccer league.

In her first appearance for FC Gold Pride, Arakawa scored the club's first ever goal against Boston Breakers leading to a 2–1 victory. It would turn out to be her only goal of the season. Following the end of the 2009 WPS season, she was back to Nippon TV Beleza.

In 2010, she moved to Urawa Reds. From 2013, she played for Chifure AS Elfen Saitama (2013-2014, 2016), Nippon TV Beleza (2015) and Nippon Sport Science University Fields Yokohama (2017). She is currently playing for Chifure AS Elfen Saitama from 2018.

National team career
On 10 June 2000, Arakawa debuted for Japan national team against Canada. She was a member of Japan for 2003, 2007 World Cup, 2004 and 2008 Summer Olympics. She played 72 games and scored 20 goals for Japan until 2011.

Club statistics

National team statistics

International goals

References

External links
 

 Japan Football Association
 Nippon TV Beleza
 FC Gold Pride

1979 births
Living people
Association football people from Tokyo
Japanese women's footballers
Japan women's international footballers
Nadeshiko League players
Nippon TV Tokyo Verdy Beleza players
FC Gold Pride players
Urawa Red Diamonds Ladies players
Chifure AS Elfen Saitama players
Nippon Sport Science University Fields Yokohama players
Expatriate women's soccer players in the United States
Japanese expatriate sportspeople in the United States
2003 FIFA Women's World Cup players
2007 FIFA Women's World Cup players
Olympic footballers of Japan
Footballers at the 2004 Summer Olympics
Footballers at the 2008 Summer Olympics
Asian Games medalists in football
Footballers at the 2006 Asian Games
Women's association football forwards
Asian Games silver medalists for Japan
Medalists at the 2006 Asian Games
Women's Professional Soccer players